Cymothoe alcimeda, the battling glider, is a butterfly of the family Nymphalidae. It is found in South Africa and Zimbabwe.

The wingspan is 40–50 mm for males and 45–55 mm for females. Adults are on wing year round, but mainly in summer from October onwards. Peaks occur in November and from February to April.

The larvae feed on Kiggelaria africana.

Subspecies
Cymothoe alcimeda alcimeda (Western Cape to Knysna)
Cymothoe alcimeda trimeni Aurivillius, 1912 (Eastern Cape along Drakensberg escarpment to KwaZulu-Natal midlands)
Cymothoe alcimeda clarki Stevenson, 1940 (Amatola range of Eastern Cape)
Cymothoe alcimeda rhodesiae Stevenson, 1934 (eastern Zimbabwe (Vumba Mountains))
Cymothoe alcimeda marieps Rydon, 1994 (south of Olifants River from Mariepskop to Barberton in Mpumalanga)
Cymothoe alcimeda transvaalica Rydon, 1994 (Limpopo Province escarpment)

References

Butterflies described in 1824
Cymothoe (butterfly)